"Wadsyaname" was supposed to be the first official single from Nelly's fifth studio album, Brass Knuckles but Nelly later confirmed that the single will not make the album (however it is a bonus track featured as #16 on the Japanese edition of "Brass Knuckles"). It was replaced by "Party People". It is produced by Neff-U, and sampled the piano line from "All My Life" by K-Ci & JoJo. The single was released to the iTunes Store on August 22, 2007. Nelly performed the single along with "Let It Go" at the 2007 BET Hip Hop Awards. The song finally appears on the album, as a UK and Japanese bonus track.

Music video 
The music video was directed by Chris Robinson.

Charts

Certifications

References

2007 singles
Music videos directed by Chris Robinson (director)
Nelly songs
Song recordings produced by Theron Feemster
Songs written by Nelly
Universal Motown Records singles
2007 songs